Vjatšeslav Divonin (born 8 May 1970) is an Estonian rower. He competed in the men's coxless four event at the 1992 Summer Olympics.

References

1970 births
Living people
Estonian male rowers
Olympic rowers of Estonia
Rowers at the 1992 Summer Olympics
Sportspeople from Narva